Aaron Bay-Schuck (born September 5, 1981) is an American music industry executive. The CEO and co-chairman of Warner Records (formerly Warner Bros. Records), he was previously the president of A&R at Interscope Geffen A&M and the senior vice president of A&R at Atlantic Records.

Early life and education
Bay-Schuck was born in Los Angeles to actors Susan Bay and John Schuck. His parents divorced when he was a child, and in 1989 his mother married actor Leonard Nimoy. His mother is a cousin of film director and producer Michael Bay.

Bay-Schuck attended Columbia University, where he majored in political science. He planned to attend law school and pursue a career in entertainment law. In his senior year, he met a video promotion executive from Capitol Records and had a conversation with her about how record companies operate. The next day he applied for an internship at Interscope Records. He was hired, and although he interned in the video promotion department, he became interested in A&R. He graduated from Columbia in 2003.

Career
Bay-Schuck returned to Los Angeles following his college graduation. Knowing that jobs at record companies had become scarce as the music industry constricted in the post-Napster era, he registered at an employment agency that placed temps at labels. He was assigned a short-term job at Interscope, and was quickly hired as a full-time assistant to Martin Kierszenbaum, then the head of international marketing for the label.  Determined to work in A&R, he left Interscope a year later to take a job as an A&R assistant at Atlantic.  In 2006, he was promoted to a staff A&R position.  His first hits in an A&R capacity were with the songs "Shawty" by Plies featuring T-Pain, and "Right Round" by Flo Rida featuring Kesha. Bay-Schuck co-wrote "Right Round," which went five times platinum in the US and sold more than 10 million copies worldwide.

Over the course of his ten years at Atlantic, Bay-Schuck worked with Cee Lo Green, B.o.B., T.I., Trey Songz, Travie McCoy, and Trick Daddy, among others. Most notably, he discovered, signed and developed Bruno Mars, who has since sold more than 170 million singles and 26 million albums worldwide. Following his success with Mars, Bay-Schuck, who had originally focused on rap and R&B, worked with artists of all genres. He was appointed senior vice president of A&R for Atlantic in 2012.

In 2014, Bay-Schuck was named president of A&R at Interscope Geffen A&M (IGA). At IGA he worked with artists including Gwen Stefani, Imagine Dragons, Lady Gaga, Skylar Grey, Maroon 5, OneRepublic, and Selena Gomez.
In October 2017, it was announced that Bay-Schuck had been appointed CEO and co-chairman of Warner Records. He assumed the position in October 2018.

Bay-Schuck was included in the Billboard Power 100  in 2019, 2020, 2021, and 2022. Bay-Schuck said that increasing the focus on pop and hip hop artists were among his goals as Warner's CEO; since then, the label has had #1 hits with Saweetie featuring Doja Cat ("Best Friend"), Dua Lipa ("Levitating") and Bebe Rexha ("Meant to Be"), and signed artists including Remble, Bella Poarch, NLE Choppa, Benson Boone, Freddie Gibbs, and Omar Apollo.

Bay-Schuch was an executive producer of the 2021 documentary Tom Petty, Somewhere You Feel Free: The Making of Wildflowers. The film won a Producers Guild Award in 2022.

References

External links
 Warner Records 

1981 births
Living people
20th-century American Jews
American music industry executives
People from Los Angeles
Columbia College (New York) alumni
21st-century American Jews